is a Paralympic tennis player from Japan who won a series of national championships such as 2011 Osaka Open, Japan Open and Peace Cup (both 2011 and 2012). He also was a winner of international championships such as Taiwan Open and the Gauteng Open in South Africa.

He competed in wheelchair tennis at the 2020 Summer Paralympics.

References

External links
 
 
 Interview in Japanese

1985 births
Living people
Japanese male tennis players
Wheelchair tennis players
Paralympic wheelchair tennis players of Japan
Wheelchair tennis players at the 2016 Summer Paralympics
Wheelchair tennis players at the 2020 Summer Paralympics
21st-century Japanese people